Buckley Park is a multi-purpose stadium on the Callan Road (N76), near Kilkenny, Ireland. Kilkenny City (formerly EMFA) purchased  of land from a local farmer by the name of Mick Murphy for £16,000. The ground was originally called Tenney Park.  It is currently used for football matches by Women's National League club Kilkenny United WFC and was previously the home stadium of Kilkenny City A.F.C.

Buckley Park has hosted many junior international soccer games. The ground is named in honour of Marty Buckley, the first president of EMFA / City . He was a former player and administrator with Green Celtic F.C. . He remained involved with EMFA / City until the 1980s, managing youth and junior teams within the club and acting as a trustee for the club until his death.

The stadium has also hosted 6 Republic of Ireland under-21 national football team games.

Ireland Futsal Union  have held outdoor training sessions during the covid pandemic

Photos
Pictures of Buckley Park:

References

Association football venues in the Republic of Ireland
Sports venues in County Kilkenny
Kilkenny United W.F.C.
Kilkenny City A.F.C.